Education City Mosque (QFIS Mosque), is the national mosque of Education City Al Rayyan in Qatar. It is located in the Minaretein building, which rests on five large columns representing the five pillars of Islam, with each featuring a verse drawn from the Quran. In 2016, the building was nominated by the Royal Institute of British Architects (RIBA) for its inaugural international prize. In 2015, it won the Best Religious Building prize at the World Architecture Festival (WAF) in Singapore. The mosque was designed by the architectural team of Mangera Yvars.

Gallery

References

2015 establishments in Qatar
Mosques in Qatar
Mosques completed in 2015
21st-century mosques